Evan Stone is an American pornographic film actor and director.

In 2011, Stone became the third actor in history to receive the AVN Award for Male Performer of the Year three times. That same year, he was listed by CNBC as one of the twelve most popular stars in porn, being the only man to make the list. Stone has also been inducted into the AVN and XRCO Halls of Fame.

Early life
Stone was born in Ames, Iowa. He was raised by his adoptive father, who worked as a firefighter, in Dallas, Texas. Stone is a 1982 graduate of Gobles High School in Gobles, Michigan. He played college football in the position of defensive lineman for the Western Michigan Broncos, a NCAA Division I team, but had to retire after suffering an injury. To make a living, he worked as a forklift driver, gas station attendant, dinner theatre performer, mechanic, and slaughterman at JBS.

Career

Stone entered the sex industry as an exotic dancer, which he did for ten years. In 1997, he began performing in adult films. Stone appeared as the monster in the 2001 parody film Hung Wankenstein. On January 1, 2001, he received the award for Male Performer of the Year at the 18th AVN Awards.

In February 2005, Stone replaced Julian as host of the cable television program Spice Hotel on Friday, Saturday, and Sunday evenings on Spice Live. The program focused on porn star couples. At the 25th AVN Awards, Stone received the honor of Male Performer of the Year for a second time.

On February 1, 2009, a 37-second clip of actress Tristan Kingsley performing oral sex on Stone, from the 2008 adult film Wild Cherries 5, was broadcast during Super Bowl XLIII to various Comcast subscribers in Tucson, Arizona. Comcast reported a significant economic loss due to the incident, and issued a monetary credit to approximately 80,000 subscribers. Following the incident, Stone reported that his website started averaging 20,000 hits daily.

In 2011, he was named by CNBC as one of the twelve most popular stars in porn, being the only man on the list. That same year, he received his third win for Male Performer of the Year at the 28th AVN Awards, becoming only the third performer in history to do so, after Lexington Steele and Manuel Ferrara, respectively. Months later, he made his directorial debut with the Hustler film TSA - Your Ass Is in Our Hands.

Selected filmography

Awards

References

External links

Interviews
 Let's Get Naughty Show Interview March 2009
 Three Time Winner Evan Stone – Interview

American male pornographic film actors
Living people
People from Dallas
Pornographic film actors from Texas
1964 births